Memory Lane is a 1929 black and white American musical film. It is an adaption to the play The Understander, written by Jo Swerling.

Cast
Eddie Leonard - Des Dupree
Josephine Dunn - Dolores Dupree
Rose Coe - Constance Dupree
George E. Stone - Danny
Huntley Gordon - Rinaldi
Jane La Verne - Constance Dupree
Blanche Carter - Nurse
Jake Kern - Orchestra Leader
Monte Carter - Stage Manager

Soundtrack
 "ROLY BOLY EYES"
Written by Eddie Leonard
Performed by Eddie Leonard
 "THE SONG OF THE ISLANDS"
Written by Charles E. King
 "Here I Am"
Words and Music by Eddie Leonard, Grace Stern, and Jack Stern
Copyright 1929 by Irving Berlin Inc.
 "There's Sugar-Cane Around My Door"
Words and Music by Eddie Leonard, Grace Stern, and Jack Stern
Copyright 1929 by Irving Berlin Inc.
 "The Bogey-Man Is Here"
Words and Music by Eddie Leonard, Grace Stern, and Jack Stern
Copyright 1929 by Irving Berlin Inc.
 "Beautiful"
Words and Music by Eddie Leonard, Grace Stern, and Jack Stern
Copyright 1929 by Irving Berlin Inc.

Status
The Film is now incomplete, with a 16mm copy of the last reel of the sound version, an incomplete print of the silent version (5 of the 6 reels) is also in the Library of Congress. An incomplete soundtrack (reels 1,3,5,6,7 and 8 of 8) also survives in the hands of a private collector.

References

External links
 Melody Lane at IMDb.com
 
 

1929 films
1929 musical films
Universal Pictures films
Films directed by Robert F. Hill
Lost American films
American black-and-white films
American musical films
1929 lost films
Lost musical films
1920s English-language films
1920s American films